James Marcou (born February 19, 1988) is an American professional ice hockey player who is currently playing for the Worcester Sharks in the American Hockey League. On March 23, 2010, he was signed as a free agent by the San Jose Sharks who assigned him to their AHL affiliate, the Worcester Sharks, for the remainder of the 2009–10 AHL season.

Awards and honors

References

External links

1988 births
American men's ice hockey forwards
Ice hockey players from New York (state)
Living people
UMass Minutemen ice hockey players
Worcester Sharks players
AHCA Division I men's ice hockey All-Americans